Thai Cave Rescue is a 6-part limited series produced by Netflix, directed by Kevin Tancharoen and Nattawut Poonpiriya. It was released on September 22, 2022.

Premise

The series is based on the events of the Tham Luang cave rescue that occurred in Tham Luang-Khun Nam Nang Non National Park during June and July 2018, in which twelve members of the Wild Boars youth football team and their assistant coach were rescued from the flooded Tham Luang Nang Non cave system.

Cast

Papangkorn "Beam" Lerkchaleampote as Coach Eak
Thaneth Warakulnukroh as Governor Narongsak Osottanakorn
Supakorn Kitsuwon as Saman Gunan
Bloom Varin as Colonel Bhak Loharjun
Urassaya Sperbund as Kelly, a Thai-American hydrology expert
Manatsanun Panlertwongsakul as Pim, a park ranger
Christopher Stollery as Rick Stanton
Nicholas Farnell as John Volanthen
Rodger Corser as Richard Harris
Damon Herriman as Craig Challen
Nicholas Bell as Vern Unsworth
Arisara Wongchalee
Tassarin Punphae
Kenneth Won as Jirasak, a geologist

The twelve members of the Wild Boars football team are played by Pratya Patong, Songpol Kantawong, Chakkapat Sisat, Thanawut Chetuku, Teeraphat Somkaew, Thanaphong Kanthawong, Thanapat Phungpumkaew, Aphisit Yookham, Watcharaphol Puangsawan, Thapanot Huttapasu, Apisit Saengchan, and Rattaphoom Nakeesathid.

Production 
In 2019, Netflix received the rights from 13 Tham Luang Company Limited, a company set up to oversee the story rights of the rescued members of the Wild Boars football team, to produce the series. Although there have been a number of films produced concerning the events, Thai Cave Rescue is the only dramatic production that was granted access to the members of the Wild Boars, and featured their perspectives of their ordeal.

On August 23, 2021, the production team of the series arrived at Tham Luang-Khun Nam Nang Non in Chiang Rai Province to prepare for the filming. Filming was conducted in the real homes of the members of the Wild Boars team as well as in the cave itself. During production, the crew experienced difficulties when Thailand was locked down due to the COVID-19 pandemic. As a result of restrictions, the number of extras was reduced and crowd scenes were drastically scaled down.

References

External links
 
 

2022 American television series debuts
2022 American television series endings
2022 Thai television series debuts
2022 Thai television series endings
2020s American drama television miniseries
2020s television miniseries
Thai drama television series
English-language Netflix original programming
Thai-language Netflix original programming
Television series based on actual events
Television series set in 2018
Television shows set in Thailand
Television shows filmed in Thailand
Tham Luang cave rescue